"Paradise" is a song by Change, released as a single in 1981. It is from the group's second album Miracles. The song's vocals were sung by James Robinson and Diva Gray. Along with the songs "Hold Tight" and "Heaven of My Life", it became a number one single on the US dance chart for five weeks. "Paradise" crossed over to the soul chart, peaking at number seven, and it also reached number 80 on the Billboard Hot 100.

Track listing
 7" Single
 "Paradise" - 3:57
 "Your Move" - 4:23

 12" Single
 "Paradise" - 5:14
 "Your Move" - 4:23

Chart positions

References

1981 singles
Change (band) songs
Songs written by Mauro Malavasi
Atlantic Records singles
1981 songs